The 1992–93 Los Angeles Kings season, was the Kings' 26th season in the National Hockey League. The highlight of the season involved appearing in the Stanley Cup Finals. During their playoff run, the Los Angeles Kings played against Canadian teams all throughout the playoffs (Calgary Flames, Vancouver Canucks, Toronto Maple Leafs, Montreal Canadiens).

Offseason
In the 1992 NHL Entry Draft, the Kings chose Justin Hocking with their first pick, 39th overall, in the second round.

Regular season

On Sunday, November 8, 1992, three Los Angeles Kings (Mike Donnelly, Jari Kurri and Luc Robitaille) scored a hat trick in an 11-4 win at San Jose.

The Kings were the most penalized team during the regular season, being shorthanded 529 times.

Los Angeles finished with 2,855 shots on goal during the regular season, second only to the Boston Bruins.

Final standings

Schedule and results

Playoffs

Conference Finals
This exciting and very heated seven-game series has long been remembered by hockey fans. The Toronto Maple Leafs iced a highly competitive team for the first time in years and were hoping to break their 26—year Stanley Cup drought; they had not even been to the Final since their last Cup win in 1967. The Los Angeles Kings, led by captain Wayne Gretzky, also had high ambitions. During Game 1 (a dominating victory for the Leafs) Los Angeles blue-liner Marty McSorley delivered a serious open ice hit on Toronto's Doug Gilmour. Leafs captain Wendel Clark took exception to the hit and went after McSorley for striking their star player. Toronto coach Pat Burns tried scaling the bench to get at Los Angeles coach Barry Melrose because he thought he ordered the hit on Gilmour (McSorley later remarked in interviews that he received dozens of death threat messages on his hotel phone from angry fans). Toronto would take a 3–2 series lead after five games. Game 6 went back west to the Great Western Forum in Los Angeles; it too was not without controversy and was also decided on an overtime goal. During the 1992–93 season, there was a league-wide crackdown on high-sticking infractions, whether they were accidental or not. In Game 6, Gilmour was part of controversy once again.  With the game tied at 4 in overtime, Wayne Gretzky accidentally clipped him in the face with the blade of his stick, while shooting a slap shot from the right face-off circle. Many thought that referee Kerry Fraser should have called a penalty on the play, but Gretzky was not penalized, and he went on to score the overtime goal moments later, evening the series at 3–3. He would score three goals in the deciding game to give Los Angeles a berth in the Stanley Cup Final for the first time in franchise history and a win a playoff series against an Original Six team for the first time in franchise history as well. Gretzky has been quoted as saying that his performance in Game 7 was the best NHL game of his career. 

May 17 - Los Angeles 1 Toronto 4
May 19 - Los Angeles 3 Toronto 2
May 21 - Toronto 2 Los Angeles 4
May 23 - Toronto 4 Los Angeles 2
May 25 - Los Angeles 2 Toronto 3 (OT)
May 27 - Toronto 4 Los Angeles 5 (OT)
May 29 - Los Angeles 5 Toronto 4

Los Angeles wins best-of-seven series 4–3

Stanley Cup Final
Los Angeles reached the finals for the first time in franchise history. For Montreal, however, it was their 34th Stanley Cup Finals appearance in franchise history. The Canadiens had defeated the Quebec Nordiques, Buffalo Sabres, and New York Islanders to reach the finals. They had won seven overtime games throughout the playoff run before heading into the Finals. In game one, the Kings romped over the Canadiens by a score of 4-1, with Luc Robitaille scoring twice on the powerplay. However, game two was a different story. With Los Angeles leading 2-1 in the game, Marty McSorley was penalized for having an illegal stick, as Montreal stormed back to win 3-2 in overtime. Following this, the Kings never recovered as Montreal would go on to win the next three games; two in overtime and one in regulation to capture their record-breaking 24th Stanley Cup championship. 

Montreal Canadiens vs. Los Angeles Kings

''Montreal wins best-of-seven series 4–1.

Player statistics

Skaters

Goaltending

† Denotes player spent time with another team before joining the Kings. Stats reflect time with the Kings only.
‡ Denotes player was traded mid-season. Stats reflect time with the Kings only.

Awards and records
 Clarence S. Campbell Bowl
 Luc Robitaille, Left Wing, NHL First Team All-Star
 Luc Robitaille, Most Goals by a Left Wing in One Season (63)

Transactions
The Kings were involved in the following transactions during the 1992–93 season.

Trades

Free agent signings

Free agents lost

Waivers

Lost in expansion draft

Draft picks

Notes
 The Kings first-round pick went to the Philadelphia Flyers as the result of a trade on February 19, 1992 that sent Kjell Samuelson, Rick Tocchet, Ken Wregget and a conditional third-round pick in 1993 to Pittsburgh in exchange for Mark Recchi, Brian Benning and this pick (15th overall).
Pittsburgh previously acquired this pick as the result of a trade on February 19, 1992 that sent Paul Coffey to Los Angeles in exchange for Jeff Chychrun, Brian Benning and this pick.
 The Kings seventh-round pick went to the New York Islanders as the result of a trade on February 18, 1992 that sent Steve Weeks to Los Angeles in exchange for this pick (159th overall).
 The Kings eighth-round pick went to the Detroit Red Wings as the result of a trade on August 15, 1990 that sent Shawn McCosh to Los Angeles in exchange for this pick (183rd overall).

References
 Kings on Hockey Database

LA Kings
Los
Los
LA Kings
Los
Los Angeles Kings seasons
Western Conference (NHL) championship seasons